Josef Niedermeier (born 7 November 1942) is a German biathlete. He competed at the 1972 Winter Olympics and the 1976 Winter Olympics.

References

External links
 

1942 births
Living people
German male biathletes
Olympic biathletes of West Germany
Biathletes at the 1972 Winter Olympics
Biathletes at the 1976 Winter Olympics
People from Traunstein (district)
Sportspeople from Upper Bavaria
20th-century German people